World Parachuting Championships is the main competitive parachuting championships in the World, and is organised by Fédération Aéronautique Internationale.

Canopy piloting

Events 
Distance
Speed
Accuracy
Freestyle

Championships

Landing and style

Events 
Accuracy landing
Freefall style

Championships 
List is incomplete

Skydiving

Events 
Formation skydiving (4-Way, 4-Way Women, 8-Way, VFS 4-Way)
Artistic (Freestyle skydiving, Freeflying)
Speed skydiving

Championships 
List is incomplete

References 
Medalists
AirSports Calendar

External links 
2014 World Championships

Parachuting organizations
Parachuting